Hickory Hills may refer to several places in the United States:

 Hickory Hills, Alabama - two locations:
 Hickory Hills, Lauderdale County, Alabama
 Hickory Hills, Morgan County, Alabama
 Hickory Hills, Georgia
 Hickory Hills, Illinois - two locations:
 Hickory Hills, Illinois, in Cook County
 Hickory Hills, Henry County, Illinois
 Hickory Hills, Maryland - three locations:
 Hickory Hills, Anne Arundel County, Maryland
 Hickory Hills, Calvert County, Maryland
 Hickory Hills, Harford County, Maryland
 Hickory Hills, Mississippi
 Hickory Hills, North Carolina
 Hickory Hills, Ohio - two locations:
 Hickory Hills, Athens County, Ohio
 Hickory Hills, Williams County, Ohio
 Hickory Hills, Pennsylvania
 Hickory Hills, Tennessee - six locations:
 Hickory Hills, Bradley County, Tennessee
 Hickory Hills, Greene County, Tennessee
 Hickory Hills, Hamilton County, Tennessee
 Hickory Hills, Knox County, Tennessee
 Hickory Hills, Rutherford County, Tennessee
 Hickory Hills, Williamson County, Tennessee
 Hickory Hill, West Virginia
 Hickory Hills, Wisconsin

See also
 Hickory Hill (disambiguation)